Chavdartsi refers to the following places in Bulgaria:

 Chavdartsi, Lovech Province
 Chavdartsi, Veliko Tarnovo Province

See also
 Chavdar (disambiguation)